The discography of Rock City (also known as R. City and Planet VI)—a songwriting and record production duo from Saint Thomas, U.S. Virgin Islands—consists of one studio album, 16 mixtapes, eight singles (including four as a featured artist) and 21 music videos. Rock City is primarily known for their songwriting and production, having written or produced songs such as "Pour It Up" by Rihanna, "Replay" by Iyaz, "Bow Down/I Been On" by Beyoncé and "We Can't Stop" by Miley Cyrus. Many albums that Rock City has contributed to have won or been nominated for Grammy Awards. For instance, the duo wrote "If This Isn't Love" on Jennifer Hudson's Grammy Award-winning self-titled album.

Albums

Studio albums

Mixtapes

Singles

As lead artist

As featured artist

Other charted songs

Guest appearances

Victoria kimani China Love ft Rock city 2017
Samantha J ft R City

Music videos

Songwriting and production

References

Rock City
Pop music discographies
Rhythm and blues discographies
Hip hop discographies